Augusteum may be:

 Augusteum
 Augusteum (Leipzig)
 Augusteum (Oldenburg)
 Augusteum (Wittenberg)